Ashur, Assur, or Asur may refer to:

Places
 Assur, an Assyrian city and first capital of ancient Assyria
 Ashur, Iran, a village in Iran
 Asur, Thanjavur district, a village in the Kumbakonam taluk of Thanjavur district, Tamil Nadu, India
 Assuras or Assur, a town in the Roman province of Proconsular Africa

Other uses
Ashur (Bible), the grandson of Noah in Genesis
 Ashur (god), the main god of Assyrian mythology in Mesopotamian religion
 Asur people, a tribal group living primarily in the Indian state of Jharkhand
 High Elves (Warhammer) or Asur, a race in Warhammer Fantasy
 Ashur, a traditional and common given and family name among Assyrian people

See also
 Asur (disambiguation)
 Assyria (disambiguation)
 Asura (disambiguation)
 Ashura (disambiguation)
 Achour (disambiguation)
 Assuristan (Sassanid name for Assyria)
 Anshar, a primordial god in the Babylonian creation myth Enuma Elish